Fladså was a municipality (Danish, kommune) in Storstrøm County in south Denmark. The municipality covered an area of 133 km², and had a total population of 7,581 (2005).  Its last mayor was Hans R. Hansen, a member of the Venstre (Liberal Party) political party. 

Neighboring municipalities were Rønnede to the east, Holmegaard to the north, Næstved to the west, and Præstø and Vordingborg to the south.  Fakse Bay (Fakse Bugt) made up part of the municipality's eastern border, and Karrebæksminde Bay (Karrebæksminde Bugt made up part of the municipality's western border.

On 1 January 2007 Fladså municipality ceased to exist due to Kommunalreformen ("The Municipality Reform" of 2007).  It merged with Fuglebjerg, Holmegaard, Næstved, and Suså municipalities to form the new Næstved Municipality.  This will create a municipality with an area of 681 km² and a total population of 78,446 (2005).  The new municipality will belong to the new Region Sjælland ("Zealand Region").

References  
 Municipal statistics: NetBorger Kommunefakta, delivered from KMD aka Kommunedata (Municipal Data)
 Municipal mergers and neighbors: Eniro new municipalities map

External links 
 Municipality's official website
 The new Næstved municipality's official website (Danish only)

Former municipalities of Denmark